Wairarapa is a New Zealand parliamentary electorate. It was first created in 1858 (with the first election in 1859) and existed until 1881. It was recreated in 1887 and has since existed continuously. In the early years, the electorate was for a time represented by two members.

Population centres
The initial 24 New Zealand electorates were defined by Governor George Grey in March 1853, based on the New Zealand Constitution Act 1852 that had been passed by the British government. The Constitution Act also allowed the House of Representatives to establish new electorates, and this was first done in 1858, when four new electorates were formed by splitting existing electorates. Wairarapa was one of those four electorates, and it was established by splitting the  electorate, and incorporating areas that previously did not belong to any electorate. Settlements in the initial area were Featherston, Carterton, Eketahuna, and Pahiatua. For the 1860 election, there were 266 voters registered.

In the 1887 electoral redistribution, although the Representation Commission was required through the Representation Act 1887 to maintain existing electorates "as far as possible", rapid population growth in the North Island required the transfer of three seats from the South Island to the north. Ten new electorates were created, and one former electorate, Wairarapa, was recreated.

The electorate boundaries were last adjusted in the 2007 redistribution. No boundary adjustments were undertaken in the subsequent 2013/14 or 2019/20 redistributions.

The current electorate includes the following population centres (approximate population in brackets) from the Wairarapa area of the Wellington region, the Tararua District (part of the Manawatū-Whanganui region) and the Central Hawke's Bay District (part of the Hawke's Bay region):
Masterton
Carterton
Featherston
 Greytown
 Martinborough
Dannevirke
 Pahiatua
Woodville
Waipukurau
Waipawa

During the 2019/20 boundary review done by the Electoral Commission, Kieran McAnulty, a List MP based in the electorate, and Central Hawke's Bay Mayor Alex Walker, proposed that the electorate be renamed to Wairarapa and Central Hawke's Bay in order to acknowledge the communities included in the electorate. Ultimately the commission decided against changing the name.

History
The first election was held on 7 November 1859, and Charles Carter was the first representative until 1865, when he resigned. He was succeeded by Henry Bunny from 1865 to 1881. Since 1871, the electorate had two representatives, and the second one was John Chapman Andrew until he resigned in 1877, succeeded by George Beetham from 1877 to 1881.

From 1881 to 1887 Wairarapa was replaced by two electorates; Wairarapa North and Wairarapa South. From 1887, they were replaced by the Masterton and Wairarapa electorates.

Between 1899 and 1919 the Wairarapa electorate swung between Walter Clarke Buchanan the Conservative then Reform candidate and J. T. Marryat Hornsby the Liberal candidate, changing hands in 1902, 1905, 1908 and 1914.  Buchanan's support was in the rural areas, and Hornsby's was in the small towns.

From 1919 to 1928 the electorate was represented by Alexander McLeod for Reform. In 1928 he was defeated by Thomas William McDonald the United (Liberal) candidate, but in 1931 McLeod won the seat back.

Ben Roberts represented the electorate for the Labour Party from the  until 1946, when he retired.

Creech also challenged more than 200 votes (on various grounds). The Electoral Court upheld Creech's petition, and Creech won the seat in 1988 with a majority of 34 votes (9994 to 9960).

Creech held the Wairarapa electorate for four parliamentary terms. In December 1997, he became Deputy Leader of the National Party. The National Party stood Paul Henry in the election, but to the general surprise of political commentators, the typically right-leaning electorate was won by Labour's Georgina Beyer with a 3,033 vote majority to become the world's first transsexual member of parliament.

Members of Parliament
Key

Single-member electorate

Multi-member electorate

Single-member electorate

List MPs
Members of Parliament elected from party lists in elections where that person also unsuccessfully contested the Wairarapa electorate. Unless otherwise stated, all MPs terms began and ended at general elections.

Election results

2020 election

2017 election

2014 election

2011 election

Electorate (as at 26 November 2011): 46,425

2008 election

2005 election

2002 election

1999 election

1996 election

1993 election

1990 election

1987 election

1984 election

1981 election

1978 election

1975 election

1972 election

1969 election

1966 election

1963 election

1960 election

1957 election

1954 election

1951 election

1949 election

1946 election

1943 election

1938 election

1935 election

1931 election

1928 election

1899 election

1893 election

1890 election

Table footnotes

Notes

References

External links
Electorate Profile  Parliamentary Library

New Zealand electorates
Politics of the Wellington Region
Wairarapa
1858 establishments in New Zealand
1887 establishments in New Zealand
1881 disestablishments in New Zealand